St. Casimir Church is a parish church of the Roman Catholic Archdiocese of Baltimore located in the Canton neighborhood of Baltimore, Maryland.

History
St. Casimir's was established as a parish in 1902, becoming an independent parish in 1904. It was established to serve the needs of the growing Polish American community in Baltimore. The church building was built and dedicated in 1927. By that time the Poles were becoming so numerous in Baltimore that less than a year later another Polish Catholic church was established in a neighboring parish, the Holy Rosary Church. There were over 11,000 Polish immigrants living in Baltimore at the time.

In 2000, the St. Stanislaus Kostka church, another Polish Catholic church in Baltimore, was merged into St. Casimir's and the sacramental registers were transferred to St. Casimir's.

The church is designated as a Polish parish and is administered by the Conventual Franciscans.

Architecture
The building's overall design is in the Neo-Renaissance style. It is also an example of the Polish Cathedral style.

See also
Polish Americans
Roman Catholicism in Poland

References

External links
 Official church website
 History of the church
 St. Casimir: In a waterside town, a parish that acts as an anchor
 Architectural information about the church
 Roman Catholic Archdiocese of Baltimore

Canton, Baltimore
Congregation of the Sisters of Saint Joseph
Franciscan churches in the United States
Polish-American culture in Baltimore
Polish-American Roman Catholic parishes in the United States
Polish Cathedral style architecture
Roman Catholic churches completed in 1926
Christian organizations established in 1902
Renaissance Revival architecture in Maryland
Roman Catholic churches in Baltimore
Roman Catholic Ecclesiastical Province of Baltimore
1902 establishments in Maryland
20th-century Roman Catholic church buildings in the United States